The Americas Zone was one of the three zones of regional Davis Cup competition in 2010.  It was divided into four groups.  Teams in Group III competed for promotion to Group II for 2011, and to avoid demotion to Group IV.

The Group III tournament was held in the Week commencing July 7, 2010 in San Juan, Puerto Rico, on outdoor hard courts.

Participating teams
 
 
  
 
  (withdrew)

Format
The eight teams were split into two groups and played in a round-robin format. The top two teams of each group advanced to the promotion pool, where the two top teams were promoted to the Americas Zone Group II in 2011. The last two placed teams of each group from the preliminary round were relegated into the relegation pool, where the two bottom teams were relegated to the Americas Zone Group IV in 2011.

Group A

Results of Individual Ties

Group B

Results of Individual Ties

Promotion pool
The top two teams from each of Group A and B advanced to the Promotion pool. Results and points from games against the opponent from the preliminary round were carried forward.

Results of Individual Ties

Puerto Rico and Haiti promoted to Group II for 2011.

Relegation pool
The bottom team from Group A and the bottom two from Group B were placed in the relegation group.  Results and points from games against the opponent from the preliminary round were carried forward.

Results of Individual Ties

Bermuda demoted to Group IV.

References

External links
Davis Cup draw details

3